Baker Mountain is a small community ski area located in Moscow, Maine. It consists of five runs (3 beginner and 2 intermediate) and a T-bar lift. The ski area is on the southern end of Pierce Hill (el. ), just north of its namesake, Baker Mountain (el. ) It was started in 1930 by Allen Quimby Jr.

Baker Mountain is run by its pass holders, who volunteer their time. During school vacations the club operates a ski school.

History
In the 1930s Allen Quimby Jr., operated a veneer mill in Bingham. An avid skier, Quimby put in the first rope tow at Baker Mountain; by the 1940s a second tow was installed. In 1968 the rope tows were removed and a T-bar was installed to bring skiers to the top of the open slope.

References

External links
New England Ski History Page on Baker Mountain

Ski areas and resorts in Maine
Buildings and structures in Somerset County, Maine
Tourist attractions in Somerset County, Maine